Trogossitini is a tribe of beetles in the subfamily Trogossitinae.

Genera 
Airora - Alindria - Corticotomus - Dupontiella - Elestora - Eupycnus - Euschaefferia - Leipaspis - Melambia - Nemozoma - Parallelodera - Seidlitzella - Temnoscheila - Tenebroides - †Cretocateres - †Thoracotes

References 

Trogossitidae
Polyphaga tribes